Hasserode has been a quarter in the town of Wernigerode in the German state of  Saxony-Anhalt since 1907.

Location 
Hasserode lies at the foot of the Harz Mountains in the valley of the River Holtemme, whose upper reaches include the water cascade of the Steinerne Renne. A state road (Landstraße) runs through the quarter to Drei Annen Hohne and Schierke in the direction of the Harz's highest mountain, the Brocken. The Harz Railway and Brocken Railway, part of the Harz Narrow Gauge Railways also run through the district which has three stations: Hochschule Harz (formerly Kirchstraße), Wernigerode-Hasserode and Steinerne Renne.

History 
The village grew up around Hasserode Castle in the 12th century, but was abandoned by the 16th century and was only reoccupied again in 1768 by order of King Frederick II of Prussia, hence the name Friedrichsthal for the lower part of the parish and the village name of Hasserode-Friedrichsthal which has been used from time to time.

Places of interest 
Christ Church with the painting Kreuzigung im Gedräng by Adam Offinger
Boeters Mill, old paper mill in Amtsgasse 1

Tourism
The Hasserode Holiday (Hasseröder Ferienpark) was established at the start of the 21st century on Langen Stieg and in the Nessel valley, on the terrain of the old open-air swimming pool. It is a holiday camp with an indoor pool.

Amongst the walking destinations in the area is the Elversstein.

People born in Hasserode 
 Johann Christian Meier (1732–1815), pedagogue
 Otto Herfurth (1893–1944), professional officer and resistance fighter on 20 July 1944

Personalities 
 Julius Count of Bose (1809–1894), Prussian infantry general, died in Hasserode

Literatur
 Brückner, Jörg (1998). Der Fund eines Wappensteins von 1121. Nachricht aus d. Jahr 1707 gibt Rätsel um Gründung Hasserodes auf, In: Neue Wernigeröder Zeitung. 9 (1998), 22, p. 23–24. 
 Boeters, Heinrich Ernst (2009). Die Boeters und ihre Papiermühlen, Seevetal

Former municipalities in Saxony-Anhalt
Wernigerode